Le Maosheng (born August 9, 1978 in Ningyuan, Yongzhou, Hunan) is a Chinese weightlifter who competed in the 2000 Summer Olympics and in the 2004 Summer Olympics.

In 2000 he finished fourth in the 62 kg class. Four years later he won the silver medal in the 62 kg class.

At the 2002 Asian Games he won with a world record clean and jerk of 182.5 kg, and a total of 322.5 kg.

Notes

References 
 Profile

1978 births
Living people
Olympic silver medalists for China
Olympic weightlifters of China
People from Yongzhou
Weightlifters at the 2000 Summer Olympics
Weightlifters at the 2004 Summer Olympics
World record holders in Olympic weightlifting
Olympic medalists in weightlifting
Asian Games medalists in weightlifting
Weightlifters from Hunan
Weightlifters at the 1998 Asian Games
Weightlifters at the 2002 Asian Games
Chinese male weightlifters

Medalists at the 2004 Summer Olympics
Asian Games gold medalists for China
Medalists at the 1998 Asian Games
Medalists at the 2002 Asian Games
World Weightlifting Championships medalists